Przedpełko Kropidłowski of Dryja was a Polish 15th century knight. According to the chronicle of Jan Długosz, during the final stage of the Battle of Grunwald he took the German knight Georg Gersdorff into captivity, together with his banner of Saint George and 40 men.

His part in the battle was described by Henryk Sienkiewicz in his novel The Teutonic Knights.

See also
 Zawisza Czarny

Polish knights
People in the Battle of Grunwald